Bəydili (also, Beydilli) is a village in the Yevlakh Rayon of Azerbaijan. The village forms part of the municipality of Gülövşə.

References 

Populated places in Yevlakh District